John Lyster (5 October 1850 – 17 January 1911) was an Irish Roman Catholic clergyman who served as Bishop of Achonry from 1888 to until his death.

Lyster was born in Athlone. He was educated at St Joseph's College, Athlone and St Patrick's College, Maynooth; and ordained in 1872. He was also Principal of Summerhill College.

References

1850 births
1911 deaths
People from Athlone
19th-century Roman Catholic bishops in Ireland
Roman Catholic bishops of Achonry
Alumni of St Patrick's College, Maynooth
20th-century Roman Catholic bishops in Ireland